European Tour is a concert tour by the reggaeton performer Daddy Yankee to promote his album Mundial. The tour visited 10 cities in 9 different countries. The tour started on May 1, 2012, in Napoli, Italy and ended in Stockholm Sweden. This tour marked the second time that he toured as a headliner in Europe.

The tour had a total attendance of 300,000 fans and setlist included some songs of his following studio album, Presitge.

Tour dates

References

2012 concert tours
Concert tours of Europe
Daddy Yankee concert tours